Jonathan Ward (born September 30, 1997) is an American football running back for the Tennessee Titans of the National Football League (NFL). He played college football at Central Michigan.

College career
Ward was a member of the Central Michigan Chippewas for four seasons. He finished his collegiate career with 2,539 yards and 28 touchdowns on 473 carries and 98 receptions for 909 yards and four touchdowns.

Professional career

Arizona Cardinals
Ward was signed by the Arizona Cardinals as an undrafted free agent on April 25, 2020. He was waived on September 5, 2020, during final roster cuts and was re-signed to the team's practice squad the next day. Ward was elevated to the Cardinals' active roster on September 26, 2020, and made his NFL debut the following day against the Detroit Lions. He reverted to the practice squad after the game. He was elevated again on October 3 for the week 4 game against the Carolina Panthers, and reverted to the practice squad again following the game. He was promoted to the active roster on October 6, 2020.

In Week 17 of the 2020 season against the Los Angeles Rams, Ward recorded his first career reception for an eleven yard touchdown during the 18–7 loss.

On October 12, 2022, Ward was placed on injured reserve with a hamstring injury. He was released on November 22.

New York Jets
On November 29, 2022, Ward was signed to the New York Jets practice squad. He was released on December 6.

Tennessee Titans
On December 14, 2022, Ward was signed to the Tennessee Titans practice squad. He was promoted to the active roster on December 29.

References

External links
Central Michigan Chippewas bio
Arizona Cardinals bio

1997 births
Living people
American football running backs
Arizona Cardinals players
Central Michigan Chippewas football players
New York Jets players
Players of American football from Illinois
Sportspeople from Kankakee, Illinois